

Vertebrates 
Tendon cells, or tenocytes, are elongated fibroblast type cells.  The cytoplasm is stretched between the collagen fibres of the tendon.  They have a central cell nucleus with a prominent nucleolus.  Tendon cells have a well-developed rough endoplasmic reticulum and they are responsible for synthesis and turnover of tendon fibres and ground substance.

Invertebrates 
Tendon cells form a connecting epithelial layer between the muscle and shell in molluscs.  In gastropods, for example, the retractor muscles connect to the shell via tendon cells.  Muscle cells are attached to the collagenous myo-tendon space via hemidesmosomes.  The myo-tendon space is then attached to the base of the tendon cells via basal hemidesmosomes, while apical hemidesmosomes, which sit atop microvilli, attach the tendon cells to a thin layer of collagen.  This is in turn attached to the shell via organic fibres which insert into the shell.  Molluscan tendon cells appear columnar and contain a large basal cell nucleus.  The cytoplasm is filled with granular endoplasmic reticulum and sparse golgi.  Dense bundles of microfilaments run the length of the cell connecting the basal to the apical hemidesmosomes.

See also 
List of human cell types derived from the germ layers

References 

 
 

Human cells
Connective tissue cells
GAG secreting cells